Superman and the Mole Men is a 1951 American independent black-and-white superhero film released by Lippert Pictures. Produced by Barney A. Sarecky and directed by Lee Sholem, it stars George Reeves as Superman and Phyllis Coates as Lois Lane. It is the first feature film based on any DC Comics character.

The film's storyline covers reporters Clark Kent (George Reeves) and Lois Lane (Phyllis Coates) arriving in the small town of Silsby to witness the drilling of the world's deepest oil well. The drill, however, has penetrated the underground home of a race of small, bald humanoids who, out of curiosity, climb to the surface at night. They glow in the dark, which scares the local townfolk, who form a mob intent on killing the strange visitors. Only Superman can intervene to prevent a tragedy.

Plot
Clark Kent and Lois Lane arrive in the small town of Silsby to report on the world's deepest oil well. That night two small, furry, bald-headed dwarf humanoids come up through the shaft and scare the elderly night watchman to death. Lois and Clark arrive at the oil well and find the dead watchman. Clark and the foreman explore the surrounding area for signs of foul play when Lois glimpses one of the creatures and screams. No one believes her when she tells them what she saw.

The medical examiner is summoned, and he later leaves with Lois. Clark stays behind to confront the foreman, who confesses that the well was closed for fear that they had struck radium and not oil. The foreman proceeds to show Clark ore samples that were collected during different stages of drilling; all of them glow brightly.

Meanwhile the two Mole Men innocently explore the town. The residents become terrified because of their peculiar appearance and that everything they touch glows in the dark (due to simple phosphorescence). Soon an angry mob forms, led by the violent Luke Benson (Jeff Corey), in order to kill the "monsters". Superman (George Reeves)  stops Benson and the mob and saves one of the creatures in mid-air after it has been shot. He takes it to the hospital. The second creature returns to the well head and disappears down its shaft.

A doctor announces that the injured creature will die unless he has surgery to remove the bullet. When a nurse refuses to do so out of fear, Clark volunteers to assist. Benson's mob arrives at the hospital demanding that the creature be turned over to them. Superman stands guard outside the hospital. Lois stands at his side, but a shot is fired from the mob, narrowly missing her. Superman sends her inside and single handedly relieves the mob of their rifles and pistols.

Three more Mole Men emerge from the drill shaft, this time bearing a strange weapon. They make their way to the hospital. Benson and his mob see the creatures, and Benson goes after them alone. The creatures fire their laser-like weapon at him. Superman jumps in front of the pulsating ray, saving Benson's life, which Superman says "is more than you deserve!". Superman fetches the wounded creature from the hospital and carries him as his companions return to the well head. Soon after, from deep underground, the Mole Men destroy the drill shaft, making certain that no one can come up or go down it ever again. Lois observes, "It's almost as if they were saying, 'You live your lives ... and we'll live ours'".

Cast

Themes
The sympathetic treatment of the strangers in the film, and the unreasoning fear on the part of the townspeople, has been compared by author Gary Grossman to the panicked public reaction to the peaceful alien Klaatu in the science fiction film The Day The Earth Stood Still, which was released the same year. Both have been considered retrospectively as the product of (and a reaction to) the "Red Scare" of post-World War II era. Grossman also cites the later film The Mole People (1956).

Production

Superman and the Mole Men is the first theatrical feature film based on any DC Comics character. Previously, there was a series of 17 produced technicolor animated Superman short subjects theatrically released by Paramount Pictures' Fleischer Studios, two live-action, multiple chapter movie serials made by Columbia Pictures Inc., based on the Superman comics feature and radio program, featuring Kirk Alyn as Superman and Noel Neill as Lois Lane, had been shown in weekly installments in movie theaters. Two additional serials based on DC's Batman, the first featuring Lewis Wilson as Batman and Douglas Croft as Robin/Dick Grayson, and the second featuring Robert Lowery as Batman and Johnny Duncan as Robin/Dick Grayson, were also made by Columbia (1943 and 1949).

The original screenplay was by "Richard Fielding", a pseudonym for Robert Maxwell and Whitney Ellsworth.

Superman and the Mole Men was filmed in a little more than 12 days starting on July 10, 1951 at RKO-Pathe Studios. The feature runs just 58 minutes and originally served as a trial balloon release for the syndicated Adventures of Superman TV series, for which it became the only two-part episode, "The Unknown People". Some elements of the original film were trimmed when converted for television, including some portions of a lengthy chase scene and all references to "Mole Men". The original film score by Darrell Calker was also removed, replaced with production library music also used in the first season of the series.

The laser-like weapon of the Mole Men, which they retrieve from their subterranean home in order to defend themselves and rescue their injured comrade, was a prop made by adding metal shoulder braces to one end of an Electrolux vacuum cleaner body; for the ray's "gun barrel" a standard metal funnel was attached to the other.

The image of actors Reeves and Coates on the theatrical release poster is a painting derived by reversing ("flopping") a publicity photograph image of the two actors, with Superman's "S shield" emblem then reversed in order for it to read correctly.

Release
Superman and the Mole Men was first released on VHS and LaserDisc by Warner Home Video on July 22, 1988, coinciding with the 50th anniversary celebrations of the Superman character that year. 

Both the two-part TV episode and the full feature are on the 2005 first season DVD release for Adventures of Superman. During 2006, the film was released as a bonus feature on the DVD 4-Disc Special Edition of Superman: The Movie. Superman and the Mole Men received a Blu-ray box set release in 2011. In 2017 Cheezy Movies released it on DVD.

References

Sources
 Warren, Bill. Keep Watching the Skies: American Science Fiction Films of the Fifties, 21st Century Edition. Jefferson, North Carolina: McFarland & Company, 2009 (First Edition 1982). .

External links 
 
 
 
 

1951 films
Superman films
Live-action films based on DC Comics
Adventures of Superman (TV series)
American black-and-white films
Films directed by Lee Sholem
Lippert Pictures films
1950s superhero films
1950s English-language films